It Just So Happens is an album by trombonist Ray Anderson which was recorded in 1987 and released on the Enja label.

Reception

The Allmusic review by Scott Yanow stated "Although trombonist Ray Anderson sounded fine on his earlier trio and quartet dates, he really comes into his own when joined by other horns. ... An excellent example of the innovative Ray Anderson's work".

Track listing
All compositions by Ray Anderson except where noted
 "Once in a While" (Michael Edwards, Bud Green) – 6:17
 "It Just So Happens" – 5:52
 "Ross the Boss" – 7:29
 "Elegy for Joe Scott" – 5:20
 "La Vie en Rose" (Louiguy, Marguerite Monnot, Édith Piaf) – 4:15
 "Once in a While" [Alternate Take] (Edwards, Green) – 6:24 Additional track on CD release
 "Raven's Jolly Jump Up" – 5:24
 "Fatelet" – 6:59
 "Fishin' With Gramps" – 4:57

Personnel
Ray Anderson – trombone
Stanton Davis – trumpet
Perry Robinson – clarinet
Bob Stewart – tuba
Mark Dresser – bass
Ronnie Burrage – drums

References

Ray Anderson (musician) albums
1987 albums
Enja Records albums
Albums recorded at Van Gelder Studio